The women's rhythmic individual all-around competition at the 2002 Asian Games in Busan, South Korea was held on 8 and 9 October 2002 at the Sajik Gymnasium.

Schedule
All times are Korea Standard Time (UTC+09:00)

Results

Qualification

Final

References

2002 Asian Games Report, Pages 445–446
Results

External links
 Official website

Rhythmic Women Individual